Saint Francis De Sales Catholic Church is located at 2900 Woodburn Avenue in the East Walnut Hills neighborhood of Cincinnati, Ohio, United States.

The congregation was organized in 1849, and its first building was dedicated on November 3, 1850. The parish patron is Saint Francis de Sales. The cornerstone was laid June 30, 1878, by Archbishop John Baptist Purcell, in the presence of nearly 10,000 persons. The edifice was dedicated December 20, 1879. The interior contains one of the finest altars in the United States, costing $20,000. The parent parishes were St. Mary's Church in Over-the-Rhine and St. Paul Church in Pendleton. The original congregation was mostly German.

The main altar at St. Francis de Sales was consecrated by Archbishop W.H. Elder on April 27, 1887. It was a gift of Joseph Kleine and his wife Agnes Kleine, and was sculpted by Fred and Henry Schroeder of Cincinnati from designs by A. Kloster of New York. The altar of pure white Rutland marble and the white marble floor cost $20,000. The altar's onyx pillars and delicate Gothic spires are flanked by statues of SS. Joseph and Agnes in honor of the donors' patron saints.

The church is home to Joseph, aka "Big Joe", which is the largest swinging bell ever cast in the United States. VanDuzen Company (formerly Buckeye Bell Foundry) at Second and Broadway downtown. The bell measures  in diameter and height respectively; it weighs , including a  clapper. It was soon decided to immobilize the bell, and for more than a century "Big Joe" has relied on a foot hammer striking its rim.

In early 1974, the church, its parish school, and its rectory were declared a historic district, the "St. Francis De Sales Church Historic District", and listed on the National Register of Historic Places.

References

External links

Parish site
Postcard Saint Francis De Sales Catholic Church
St. Francis de Sales Church
Big Joe going to tower
Parish Profile
Francis G. Himpler, architect

Roman Catholic churches completed in 1879
19th-century Roman Catholic church buildings in the United States
Roman Catholic churches in Cincinnati
German-American history
German-American culture in Cincinnati
Gothic Revival church buildings in Ohio
Historic districts in Cincinnati
Churches on the National Register of Historic Places in Ohio
National Register of Historic Places in Cincinnati
Historic districts on the National Register of Historic Places in Ohio
Cincinnati Local Historic Landmarks